Kähri may refer to several villages in Estonia:

Kähri, Põlva County, village in Põlva Parish, Põlva County
Kähri, Valga County, village in Otepää Parish, Põlva County
Kähri, Võru County, village in Rõuge Parish, Põlva County